Jean Annette Watters,   Briggs (15 October 1925 – 15 September 2018) was an English cryptanalyst and Women's Royal Naval Service personnel who was one of around 10,000 women enlisted to decrypt the Enigma machine code at Bletchley Park and never revealed details of her work.

Biography
Jean Briggs Watters was born in Bury St Edmunds in Suffolk, England on 15 October 1925. She was the oldest of three sisters and went on to attend art school in Cambridge, before taking on a deferment to join the Women's Royal Naval Service. When Watters was later recruited as one of around 10,000 women into the top-classified Ultra programme to decrypt the Enigma machine code at Bletchley Park in Buckinghamshire, a false story was created to say that she was a London bus driver to maintain secrecy of the project and she did not reveal any details of her work. She operated an electromechanical machine known as a "bombe" to read signals transmitted by the German Armed Forces.

Watters married United States Army Air Corps B-17 pilot John Watters at Saint Mary's Church, Westley soon after Victory in Europe Day and he received permission from the Government of the United Kingdom for his wife to leave the Navy to begin their life together. They had six children. Although the couple moved to the United States in 1969, Watters refused to take up citizenship, resisting pleas from her husband to do so. In the country, she took on the role of a housewife, creating birthday cards for her children by hand and painted. Her paintings were exhibited and she declined all offers from others to purchase her work. Watters also volunteered as a public school librarian and a tutor, regularly opening her home during the holiday period to help disadvantaged children in their education.

Furthermore, she cooked on a broad culinary range and her recipes were sent across the world. Watters was a keen gardener and played contract bridge and mahjong to a high level. In 2009, her work in the Ultra programme was officially lifted and her work was recognised by Gordon Brown, the Prime Minister, with a medal for her contribution. Watters died on 15 September 2018 in Omaha, Nebraska.  Her eldest son Robin insisted that she be buried with full British military honours at the Omaha National Cemetery on 24 September. Watters is immortalised in an interactive display in the United States Air Force hangar at the Imperial War Museum at Duxford.

See also
 List of women in Bletchley Park
 List of people associated with Bletchley Park

References

External links
 

1925 births
2018 deaths
Military personnel from Bury St Edmunds
English expatriates in the United States
British cryptographers
Bletchley Park women
Women's Royal Naval Service officers
British women librarians
Bletchley Park people
Women's Royal Naval Service personnel of World War II